Anthony Tremaine Dixson (born August 30, 1989), known professionally as Westside Boogie (stylised as WESTSIDE BOOGIE; formerly known as Boogie), is an American rapper. He is known for bringing  real life experiences into his music. His debut mixtape, Thirst 48, was released on June 24, 2014, followed by his next mixtape, The Reach which was released a year later. In 2016, he released his third mixtape Thirst 48, Pt. II and signed to Shady Records and Interscope Records in 2017. His debut studio album, Everythings for Sale, was released on January 25, 2019. His second album More Black Superheroes was released on June 17, 2022.

Early life 
Anthony Tremaine Dixson was born on August 30, 1989 in Compton, California, where he was also raised, and was a member of the church choir. His son, Darius, was born June 24, 2009, and was the catalyst for him to take music more seriously. In 2010, he enrolled in recording courses at Long Beach City College, using financial aid money to purchase recording equipment. He is also a single father of his son, working in part-time jobs and eventually, rapping became his full-time career.

Musical career

2014–2016: Thirst 48, The Reach and Thirst 48, Pt. II 
Boogie's musical career started when he joined the First Evergreen Missionary Baptist Church choir in 8th grade under the guidance of his mother. While a member of the choir, he was introduced to gangbanging and slowly began to make the transition from gospel to rap. On June 24, 2013, he released his debut mixtape Thirst 48, which chronicled his life and struggles. A year later, his debut was followed by his breakthrough mixtape The Reach, was released on June 24. He signed a deal with Interscope Records in 2015.

His break out single, "Oh My" was released in 2015 and produced by Jahlil Beats. In 2016, Boogie released Thirst 48, Pt. II via Interscope Records, a continuation of his debut mixtape from 2014 that also deals with new themes such as Millennial reliance on social media.

2017–present: Everythings for Sale
In October 2017, it was announced that Boogie signed to Shady Records. He was featured in the digital 2017 BET Hip-Hop Awards Detroit Cypher and made an appearance behind Eminem in his solo freestyle. His first release from Shady Records was "Violence", a collaboration with Masego, in December 2017. The release was followed up by two more songs in 2018 - "Self Destruction" in May and "Deja Vu" in August. He has gained praise from Rihanna, Eminem and Kendrick Lamar.

Boogie is currently managed by Love Renaissance (LVRN). He opened for 6lack alongside Tierra Whack on 6lack's world tour. Boogie's debut album, Everythings for Sale, was released on January 25 with melodic singles like "Rainy Days", "Silent Ride" and "Self Destruction". The album includes guest appearances from Eminem, 6lack, and JID, among others.

Discography

Studio albums

Mixtapes

Singles

Guest appearances

References

1989 births
Living people
21st-century American rappers
African-American male rappers
Long Beach City College alumni
Musicians from Compton, California
Place of birth missing (living people)
Rappers from California
21st-century American male musicians
Shady Records artists
21st-century African-American musicians
20th-century African-American people